WJTB was a commercial daytime-only radio station that was licensed to North Ridgeville, Ohio at 1040 AM, and broadcast from 1984 to 2017.

Owned by Taylor Broadcasting Co., the station had broadcast a combination of gospel music and religious programming, serving the Greater Cleveland area. For a period of time, WJTB also served as the Cleveland affiliate for the Sheridan Gospel Network. WJTB's studios (since demolished) were located in Elyria, while the station's transmitter resided on Root Road in North Ridgeville.

History
WJTB first went on the air on September 16, 1984.  In February 2012, the Federal Communications Commission (FCC) fined WJTB $10,000 for failing to maintain a management and staff presence at its main studio. On June 2, 2017, the station's license was canceled for not paying debts it owed to the FCC.

References

External link
FCC Station Search Details: DWJTB (Facility ID: 64644)

1984 establishments in Ohio
Defunct radio stations in the United States
Radio stations established in 1984
JTB
Radio stations disestablished in 2017
2017 disestablishments in Ohio
JTB
JTB